Flókadalur is a valley and region in Borgarfjarðarsýsla. The valley lies between Reykholtdalur and Lundarreykjadalur, and through it flow the rivers Flókadalsá and Geirsá.

References
 Íslenska Alfræðiorðabókin, volume 1, by Ritstjórar Dóra Hafsteinsdóttir and Sigríður Harðardóttir, published by Örn and Örlygur, 1990.

Valleys of Iceland